Raymond Anthony Bellm (born 20 May 1950) is an racing driver from the United Kingdom.

Driving career 

He began his racing career in 1980, running in historic racing series and winning the British Historic 2-litre GT class in 1983 and 1984 driving his Chevron B19 sports car. He made the move to modern sports car racing in 1984, driving for Gordon Spice. The pair founded Spice Engineering in 1985 and construct Group C chassis.

As part of the Spice team, Bellm would win the World Sportscar C2 Championship in 1985, 1986 and 1988. He was also able to share a Le Mans win with Gordon Spice in each of those three years, before finally leaving the team in 1990.

In the early 1990s he moved to the British Touring Car Championship, driving for Vic Lee Motorsport, finishing fifth overall in 1991. Following Lee's arrest and imprisonment for drug trafficking, Bellm and Steve Neal  co-founded Team Dynamics in 1993, eventually selling his share in the company to Neal. He won the International GT championship in 1994, and the BPR Global GT Series in 1996 driving a McLaren F1 GTR to 11 wins in two years. He also won the 1991 Willhire 24 Hour at Snetterton in a BMW M3 co-driven with Kurt Luby and Will Hoy.

Since then he has returned to historics, including running the Le Mans Classic in 2004 and 2006. He also turned to rallying coming sixth in the 2000 London-Sydney Rally and in 2005 won three rounds of the British Historic Rally Championship in a Mk1 Ford Escort. In 2005 he contested the British round of the World Rally Championship in Group N classed car finishing seventh. In 2006 he finished sixth in Finland and twelfth in Rally Great Britain.

He has served as chairman of the British Racing Drivers' Club (BRDC) from 2004 to 2005, and was responsible for negotiations with Formula One Management which resulted in the successful resigning of the British Grand Prix in 2005.

Bellm also owned and ran the Silverstone based motorsport equipment retailer, Grand Prix Racewear, having bought a majority stake in 1994. 

In 2011, Bellm started the 106 Drivers Club, an event based company to run social road car tours for owners of the iconic 3 seater Mclaren F1. Celebrating milestone anniversaries, the 20th and 25th anniversaries attracted 22 chassis of the 103 that remain.

Racing record

24 Hours of Le Mans results 
(key)

Complete British Touring Car Championship results 
(key) (Races in bold indicate pole position – 1990 in class) (Races in italics indicate fastest lap)

 – Race was stopped due to heavy rain. No points were awarded.

References

External links 
 Brief career summary at btccpages.com

1950 births
Living people
British Touring Car Championship drivers
24 Hours of Le Mans drivers
World Sportscar Championship drivers
BMW M drivers